Walter F. Morris Jr. (1953-2019) was an American cultural preservationist.

Life
He is coordinator of Mexican initiatives the NGO Aid to Artisans, based in Hartford, Connecticut.
He is a member of the Board of the Pellizzi Collection of Textiles of Chiapas. 
He is a research associate at the Science Museum of Minnesota.
He is program coordinator for lead-free pottery of the United States Agency for International Development.

Awards
 1983 MacArthur Fellows Program
 1988 Anisfield-Wolf Book Award with Jeffrey Jay Foxx

Works
 The weaving and folk art of Chiapas, Mexico, Publicaciones Pokok, 1979
 "Maya Time Warps", Archaeology 39 No. 3 1986

References

External links
 https://www.macfound.org/fellows/192/
 http://mayaexploration.com/staff_morris.php
 https://thrumsbooks.com/meet-the-author-chip-morris-8/
 http://oaxacaculture.com/2019/10/the-passing-of-walter-chip-morris-chiapas-textile-icon/
 https://www.eluniversal.com.mx/estados/fallece-en-chiapas-walter-chip-morris-jr-investigador-de-la-cultura-maya

Living people
MacArthur Fellows
1953 births